Darren John Hughes (born 6 October 1965) is an English former footballer. A left-back noted for his pace, he made 388 league and cup appearances for six clubs over a fourteen-year career in the English Football League.

Starting his senior career at Everton in 1983, he was unable to make the grade at the First Division champions, despite helping the youth team to lift the FA Youth Cup, and so was allowed to leave for Shrewsbury Town in June 1985. After one season with the "Shrews" he signed with Brighton & Hove Albion for a £35,000 fee in September 1986. In September 1987 he signed with Port Vale, where he spent seven years and made 184 league appearances. He helped the "Valiants" to win promotion out of the Third Division in 1989. He then spent January to November 1995 at Northampton Town, before transferring to Exeter City. After two seasons at Exeter he moved into non-league football with Morecambe and Newcastle Town.

Career

Everton
Hughes started his career at Everton, playing in the FA Youth Cup final defeat to Norwich City in 1983, and the victory over Stoke City in the following year's final – he scored the winning goal against Stoke from well outside the penalty box. He signed his first professional contract in October 1983. As John Bailey's understudy, he made his first team debut on 27 December 1983, in a 3–0 defeat to Wolverhampton Wanderers at Molineux. He played in the final two First Division games of the title winning 1984–85 season: a 4–1 loss to Coventry City at Highfield Road and a 2–0 defeat to Luton Town at Kenilworth Road. Manager Howard Kendall allowed him to join Shrewsbury Town on a free transfer in June 1985.

Shrewsbury to Brighton
He helped Chic Bates's "Shrews" to post a 17th-place finish in the Second Division in 1985–86. Hughes left Gay Meadow on a £30,000 transfer to league rivals Brighton & Hove Albion in September 1986, two weeks after playing a game between the two clubs. He said he had been happy at Shrewsbury, but felt that Brighton were a bigger club. He made his debut at the Goldstone Ground in a 3–0 defeat to Birmingham City in the Full Members Cup on 1 October, and made his league debut for the club in a 1–0 home win over Stoke City three days later. However, the midfielder could not prevent the "Seagulls" from suffering relegation in last place in the 1986–87 season. Manager Alan Mullery was sacked in January and Hughes retained his first-team place under new boss Barry Lloyd, though results did not improve.

Port Vale
Hughes joined John Rudge's Port Vale on loan in September 1987, before signing permanently for a £5,000 fee later that month. He claimed a goal against former employers Brighton in a 2–0 win at Vale Park on 28 September, and went on to make 53 appearances for the "Valiants" in the 1987–88 campaign. He was converted from central midfield to become the club's regular left-back. He played 56 games in the 1988–89 season, including both legs of the Third Division play-off Final victory over Bristol Rovers. He then played 46 matches in the 1989–90 season, as Vale settled into the Second Division. Teammate and club legend Phil Sproson named him as the club's best left-back of the 1980s. However, he could only play 18 games in the 1990–91 season, as he suffered a hernia injury and underwent two operations to fix it; during his absence Nigerian loanee Reuben Agboola took his place. Hughes returned to fitness by April 1991. He made 49 appearances in the 1991–92 relegation season, and scored past Newcastle United in a 2–2 draw at St James' Park. He ruptured a thigh muscle in July 1992 and again battled through two surgical procedures to correct it during the 1992–93 season; this caused him to miss the play-off Final and League Trophy Final. Still injured at the start of the 1993–94 season, he found, to his dismay, that he was released by the club in February 1994. He took the club to an industrial tribunal citing unfair dismissal, the result of which was a six-week trial in August 1994 to prove his 'fitness and ability'. He quit the club in November 1994 after being dissatisfied there, and moved on to Northampton Town in January 1995.

Later career
He helped Ian Atkins's "Cobblers" to a 17th-place finish in the Third Division in 1994–95, before he left Sixfields to switch to Exeter City in November 1995. He made 62 Third Division appearances, as Peter Fox's "Grecians" struggled at the foot of the English Football League in 1995–96 and 1996–97. He then departed St James Park for Morecambe. He played ten games as he helped Jim Harvey's "Shrimpers" to a fifth-place finish in the Conference National in 1997–98. He left the Globe Arena and later played for Newcastle Town in the North West Counties League.

Style of play
Hughes was a pacey left-back, though injuries prevented him from reaching his full potential. He spent his early career as a midfielder.

Later life
After retiring as a player, Hughes ran a construction business.

Career statistics
Source:

Honours
Everton
FA Youth Cup: 1984; runner-up: 1983

Port Vale
Football League Third Division play-offs: 1989

References

1965 births
Living people
Sportspeople from Prescot
English footballers
Association football fullbacks
Association football midfielders
Everton F.C. players
Shrewsbury Town F.C. players
Brighton & Hove Albion F.C. players
Port Vale F.C. players
Northampton Town F.C. players
Exeter City F.C. players
Morecambe F.C. players
Newcastle Town F.C. players
English Football League players
National League (English football) players
North West Counties Football League players